E Polis Torino is an Italian local newspaper owned by the San Marino-based publishing company E Polis and based in Turin, Italy. 
	
Although it is not a free newspaper, 70% of copies are distributed free near very busy locations like universities, railway stations, airports, and shopping centres; the paper is also regularly sold at newsstands.

External links
 E Polis Torino Official Website 

2008 establishments in Italy
Italian-language newspapers
Newspapers published in Turin
Newspapers established in 2008
Daily newspapers published in Italy